Vakhtang Murvanidze (born 13 October 1979 in Tbilisi) is a Georgian former competitive figure skater. He is a multiple Georgian national champion and represented Georgia twice at the Olympics, in 2002 (17th) and 2006 (28th). His highest placement at the European Championships was 7th in 2003. He was the flag bearer for Georgia at the 2006 Winter Olympics.

Early in his career, Murvanidze was coached by Leila Dolidze and Igor Rusakov. By 2001, he was with Elena Tchaikovskaya and Vladimir Kotin in Moscow. In spring 2003, he joined Alexander Zhulin in New Jersey. In his final season, 2005–06, he was coached by Craig Maurizi in New Jersey.

Programs

Results
GP: Grand Prix

References

External links

 

1979 births
Living people
Male single skaters from Georgia (country)
Figure skaters at the 2002 Winter Olympics
Figure skaters at the 2006 Winter Olympics
Olympic figure skaters of Georgia (country)
Sportspeople from Tbilisi